Aghafin (from , meaning "White River", referring to the River Finn) is a townland in the Electoral Division of Clones Rural, in the Barony of Dartree, in County Monaghan, Ireland.

Geography
It is bounded on the north by Mullanahinch townland, on the west by Annachullion Glebe and Magheranure townlands, on the east by Drumaddagorry and Rathkeevan townlands, and on the south by Coraghy, Lisoarty and Longfield townlands.

References

Townlands of County Monaghan